83 Leonis Bb, also catalogued as HD 99492 b or abbreviated 83 Leo Bb, is an extrasolar planet approximately 59 light-years away in the constellation of Leo (the Lion). The planet was discovered in January 2005 by the California and Carnegie Planet Search team, who use the Doppler spectroscopy method to detect planets. It orbits in a close orbit around the star, completing one orbit in about 17 days.

See also 

 16 Cygni Bb

References

External links
 
 

Leo (constellation)
Exoplanets discovered in 2005
Giant planets
Exoplanets detected by radial velocity

de:83 Leonis Bb